Ajofrín is a municipality located in the province of Toledo, Castile-La Mancha, Spain. As of 2008, it was home to 2328 inhabitants (INE 2008). Its name derives from the Arabic Al-Ya'rar, or "the place of the Yafar or Jafar".

History
Ancient Roman ruins indicate a continuous settlement since the Roman Empire. During the 15th century, the municipality was under the control of the Church of Toledo, and was at that point in history called a villa. The local copper mine, whose meager production supported the town's growth during the Renaissance, was abandoned during the mid-18th century.

Geography
The municipality is located on a granite mesa in the northernmost reaches of the Montes de Toledo. It shares borders with the municipalities of Burguillos de Toledo, Nambroca, Chueca, Sonseca, Mazarambroz, and Layos.

Industry
The primary industry of the area is agriculture. 60% of the territory of Ajofrín is cultivated, with 55% as vineyards, and the rest growing sugarbeets, olives, and cereal grains.

References 

Municipalities in the Province of Toledo